BlackEnergy Malware was first reported in 2007 as an HTTP-based toolkit that generated bots to execute distributed denial of service attacks. In 2010, BlackEnergy 2 emerged with capabilities beyond DDoS. In 2014, BlackEnergy 3 came equipped with a variety of plug-ins. A Russian-based group known as Sandworm (aka Voodoo Bear) is attributed with using BlackEnergy targeted attacks. The attack is distributed via a Word document or PowerPoint attachment in an email, luring victims into clicking the seemingly legitimate file.

BlackEnergy 1 (BE1) 

BlackEnergy's code facilitates different attack types to infect target machines. It is also equipped with server-side scripts which the perpetrators can develop in the command and control (C&C) server. Cybercriminals use the BlackEnergy bot builder toolkit to generate customized bot client executable files that are then distributed to targets via email spam and phishing e-mail campaigns. BE1 lacks the exploit functionalities and relies on external tools to load the bot. BlackEnergy can be detected using the YARA signatures provided by the United States Department of Homeland Security (DHS).

Key features  

 Can target more than one IP address per hostname
 Has a runtime encrypter to evade detection by antivirus software
 Hides its processes in a system driver (syssrv.sys)

Command types 
 DDoS attack commands (e.g. ICMP flood, TCP SYN flood, UDP flood, HTTP get flood, DNS flood, etc.)
 Download commands to retrieve and launch new or updated executables from its server
 Control commands (e.g. stop, wait, or die)

BlackEnergy 2 (BE2) 

BlackEnergy 2 uses sophisticated rootkit/process-injection techniques, robust encryption, and a modular architecture known as a "dropper". This decrypts and decompresses the rootkit driver binary and installs it on the victim machine as a server with a randomly generated name.  As an update on BlackEnergy 1, it combines older rootkit source code with new functions for unpacking and injecting modules into user processes. Packed content is compressed using the LZ77 algorithm and encrypted using a modified version of the RC4 cipher. A hard-coded 128-bit key decrypts embedded content. For decrypting network traffic, the cipher uses the bot's unique identification string as the key. A second variation of the encryption/compression scheme adds an initialization vector to the modified RC4 cipher for additional protection in the dropper and rootkit unpacking stub, but is not used in the inner rootkit nor in the userspace modules. The primary modification in the RC4 implementation in BlackEnergy 2 lies in the key-scheduling algorithm.

Capabilities 
 Can execute local files
 Can download and execute remote files
 Updates itself and its plugins with command and control servers
 Can execute die or destroy commands

BlackEnergy 3 (BE3) 

The latest full version of BlackEnergy emerged in 2014. The changes simplified the malware code: this version installer drops the main dynamically linked library (DLL) component directly to the local application data folder.
This variant of the malware was involved in the December 2015 Ukraine power grid cyberattack.

Plug-ins  

 fs.dll — File system operations
 si.dll — System information, “BlackEnergy Lite”
 jn.dll — Parasitic infector
 ki.dll — Keystroke Logging
 ps.dll — Password stealer
 ss.dll — Screenshots
 vs.dll — Network discovery, remote execution
 tv.dll — Team viewer
 rd.dll — Simple pseudo “remote desktop”
 up.dll — Update malware
 dc.dll — List Windows accounts
 bs.dll — Query system hardware, BIOS, and Windows info
 dstr.dll — Destroy system
 scan.dll — Network scan

References

Malware toolkits
Windows trojans
Cyberattacks on energy sector